The 1910–11 South Carolina men's basketball team represents University of South Carolina during the 1910–11 college men's basketball season. The team had finished with a final record of 1–1.

Schedule

|-

References

South Carolina Gamecocks men's basketball seasons
South Carolina
South Carolina Gamecocks men's basketball
South Carolina Gamecocks men's basketball